FC Ajax Lasnamäe is an Estonian football club based in Tallinn. They play in the II Liiga East/North zone, the fourth division in Estonian football.

The club also has women's team, first appearing in the top division in 2018.

History
They managed to avoid relegation in 2006, their first Meistriliiga season, finishing 8th.
In 2003 and 2004, the club was known as F.C.A. Estel Tallinn.

2010 season
FC Ajax Lasnamäe started the 2010 Esiliiga season strongly and eventually finished third behind both FC Flora's and Levadia's reserve squads and thus was promoted to Meistriliiga for the 2011 season.

Statistics

League and Cup

Players

Current squad
 As of 29 August 2016.

References

External links
 Official website 
 Team statistics Estonian Football Association

 
Football clubs in Tallinn
Association football clubs established in 1993
Meistriliiga clubs
1993 establishments in Estonia